Jim Catania (born January 5, 1954), commonly known as Mr. Jim, replaced drummer Manny Martínez in The Misfits in the fall of 1977 and remained in the band until November 1978. Catania had been in an earlier band called Koodot And Boojang with Glenn Danzig. Mr. Jim is featured on the same songs as Franché Coma. Jim left the band soon after Franché did and returned to his other band Continental Crawler. He later played for The Adults and Aces and Eights. Both Jim and Manny were from Lodi, New Jersey and graduated from Lodi High School in 1971. After leaving Lodi, Jim moved to Hawthorne, New Jersey with his wife. Mr. Jim and his wife later moved to Hoboken, New Jersey. He opened his own music and DVD store called Mr. Jim's House of Video in Belleville, New Jersey in December 2008.

As for his playing style, he is known for his frantic 4/4 rock beats, ghoulish cymbals and extremely fast footwork on the bass drum and 16th-note precision on the hi-hat.

As of August 2010, Mr. Jim is playing in The Exstatics with Paul of the Living Dead, formerly of The Undead and the Bad Whoremoans. Jim Catania has also joined the Von Frankensteins, according to an article from Blabbermouth.net. Mr. Jim's latest projects include the instrumental surf album entitled "Monkey with a Gun" and a currently untitled punk rock album. In August 2012 he recorded a Misfits cover of 'Hollywood Babylon' with Robby Bloodshed. Jim most recently recorded drums for the single "Red Ice" with Robby Bloodshed off of the full length "Running Out Of Time".

Discography with The Misfits
Bullet (1978) - Single
Beware (1980) - EP
Legacy of Brutality (1985) - Compilation
Collection I (1986) - Compilation
Collection II (1996) - Compilation
The Misfits (1996) - Box set
Static Age (1997) - Album

Discography with Continental Crawler
Promotional Pollution (1979) - EP
"The Anthology 1977-79: Cars, Cards And Questionable Women" (2008) - CD

References 

1954 births
Living people
American punk rock drummers
American male drummers
Horror punk musicians
Lodi High School (New Jersey) alumni
Misfits (band) members
People from Lodi, New Jersey
20th-century American drummers
American people of Italian descent
American heavy metal drummers